Bacchisa subbasalis is a species of beetle in the family Cerambycidae. It was described by Breuning in 1956. It is known from India.

References

S
Beetles described in 1956